Corn & Peg is a Canadian animated children's television series produced by Nelvana for Nick Jr. and Treehouse TV. The series revolves around the titular best friends, a unicorn and pegasus named Corn and Peg respectively, who are dynamic do-gooders striving to make their town, Galloping Grove, a better place. In the United States, a sneak peek of the series aired on Nickelodeon on February 22, 2019, before its official premiere on March 4. It was renewed for a second season in April 2019.

Plot
Corn & Peg follows the adventures of two dynamic do-gooders; a blue unicorn called Corn, and a pink Pegasus called Peg. Best friends, schoolmates, and inseparable since preschool and influenced by their favorite superhero and role model, Captain Thunderhoof, these inseparable best friends go around their community of Galloping Grove to make a better place by helping anyone they can.

Characters

Main
 Corn (voiced by Colin Critchley in the pilot, Jaiden Cannatelli in season 1–2, and Niko Ceci in season 2) is a blue unicorn with a darker blue mane and tail, and wears a red jacket.  He idolizes Captain Thunderhoof and has dedicated his life to doing good deeds for others along with his best friend, Peg. He used to be shy and scared of making friends until he met Peg at a bench while they were in preschool. He can use his horn if there is a need for light, or he can use it to pop or cut things. He can sometimes get goofy and clumsy and has kind of a big appetite, but he is still very loyal and often likes to encourage Peg by branding her as the best at everything that she does.
 Peg (voiced by Shechinah Mpumlwana) is a pink Pegasus with a golden-yellow mane and tail with flowers, and wears a turquoise dress. She's Corn's best friend and is rarely ever seen without him. Like Corn, she also idolizes Captain Thunderhoof and is dedicated to doing good deeds for others. Being a Pegasus, she is capable of flight, but because her wings are so tiny, she can't reach high altitudes and is limited to how much hang time she can have while airborne.  She's also pretty strong for a foal her size. Peg loves to laugh at Corn's antics and fortunately doesn't get too annoyed by his goofiness.
 Captain Thunderhoof (voiced by Julie Sype) is a white alicorn with a sky blue mane and tail. She is a superhero who stars in a TV show and acts as a role model to both Corn and Peg. Most everyone in Galloping Grove is a huge fan of her. She is mostly summoned when Corn and Peg shine their horn and wings respectively, though they only call her when there is an emergency. Though powerful, her weakness is ice (which causes her superpowers to freeze).

Recurring
 Ferris (voiced by Shayle Simons) is an orange pony with an orange Afro.  Corn and Peg are his closest friends. He loves carrots and Captain Thunderhoof but often doesn't have the best of luck.
 Clarissa (voiced by Ava Close) is a pink pony with a blue mane and wears a blue jacket. She is another friend of Corn and Peg's.  She's all about fashion and is the leader of a team of cheer-leading ponies known as the Posies.  She's obsessed with Twinkle Piggy and just recently became a big sister to baby Marissa.
 Paisley, Praxton & Prue (The Posies) (voiced by Gabby Clarke, Isis Moore and Matilda Simons) are Clarissa's three best friends, a clique and not to be confused with the American rock band of the same name.
 Ferdy (voiced by Jackson Reid) is Ferris' little brother.  He loves Corn and Peg but often gets into mischief. Because of his young age, his vocabulary is a little flawed. 
 Mayor Montagu (voiced by Neil Crone) is the mayor of Galloping Grove.  He's a tan horse with a brown mustache who wears a dark blue suit and top hat as well as spectacles. He does his best to make sure Galloping Grove is at its best. When Corn and Peg meet him, they treat him with the salutation, "How do, Mayor Montagu?" 
 Farmer Shire (voiced by Katie Griffin) is Galloping Grove's farmer.  She often has trouble keeping her animals under control and often asks Corn and Peg to help her with that.
 Todd (voiced by Josh Graham) is a friend of the main characters that runs a comic store. Though he tends to run out of things very quickly much to Corn and Peg's dismay.
 Miss Sassy (voiced by Stacey DePass) is a horse who runs a garment store. She wears high-heels on all fours.
 Carrier Pintock (voiced by Paloma Nuñez) is Galloping Grove's mail-delivery horse.
 Penny Pintock (voiced by Bryn McAuley) is Carrier Pintock's best friend and sister who lives in Trottingham.
 Pippa (voiced by Elana Dunkelman) is a pilot who takes Corn and Peg to places outside of Galloping Grove.
 Chef Rigatoni (voiced by Mac Heywood) is a professional chef whom Peg idolizes.
 Sheriff Swiftstone (voiced by Doug Murray) is a police officer whose job is to make sure Galloping Grove is all under control and all of the residents are obeying the law.
 Ferris and Ferdy's Parents
 Captain Bluehoof is the founder of Galloping Grove.
 Stella (voiced by Jessica Liadsky) is a salon stylist who owns her own store called Stella's Salon and has a baby child.
 Miss Rider (voiced by Athena Karkanis) is a teacher at Featherhorn Elementary.
 Slater (voiced by Aidan Wojtak-Hissong in season 1 and Callum Shoniker in season 2) is a lonesome foal who just wants friends to play with, which Corn and Peg give support to.
 Viv (voiced by Alanna Bale) is Eddie's cousin who wants to watch her cousin in the race.
 Eddie (voiced by Mac Heywood) is a racehorse who is Viv's cousin.
 Miss Biscuit (voiced by Elizabeth Hanna)
 The Hoofersons (voiced by Helen King, Chris Jabot and Mia SwamiNatahan) are the family that live right next door to Peg.
 Dolly (voiced by Elley-Ray Hennesey) is Featherhorn Elementary's lunch horse.
 Commander Hayfield (voiced by Peter Cugno) is an astronaut who, with Corn and Peg, help Ferris try to become an astronaut like him.
 Handyhoof Hal (voiced by Joseph Motiki)
 Ooompah Band is the town's band.
 Dr Trotski (voiced by Brandi Marie Ward) is the doctor of Galloping Grove.
 Paolo (voiced by Christian Distefano) is a friend Corn and Peg meet at school who has a talent for beat-boxing.
 Coach Clydesdale (voiced by Zachary Bennett) is a brown horse who trains younger foals on sports and other activities. 
 Jordy (voiced by Chloe Bryer) is a young foal who has a dream of being a trailblazer like Corn and Peg, but she has a short attention span and tends to make disasters out of almost everything that she does.
 Fire Chief Helen (voiced by Nicki Burke) is the head of Galloping Grove's fire department.
 Tugboat Ted (voiced by Jamie Watson) is the captain of his own ship and once see the sea stallion named Stanley.
 Tuck is Skip's pet dog and co-ski patrol rescuer.
 Mr Mule (voiced by Neil Foster) 
 Ruby McDougal (voiced by Hattie Kragten) is the star player of the Featherhorn Flyers, her secret weapon of the game is backwards.
 Trent Trotter (voiced by Dan Petronijevic) is an Action News report for Galloping Grove Action News.
 Prancelot, Clyde, Giddy-Up and Frolic (The Backsteed Boys) (voiced by Cory Doran, Danny Smith, Deven Mack and Anthony Sardinha) are a boy band that everyone in Galloping Grove is a fan, especially Corn and Peg. They are a parody of the Backstreet Boys.
 Mayor Stable is the mayor of Hoofing Hills.
 Pilot Pete (voiced by A.C. Peterson) is a retired pilot.
 Teddy Tumbleweed (voiced by Andrew Jackson) is a cowboy who helps Corn and Peg how to become cowboys just like him.
 Sage, Chip & Danny (voiced by Makenna Beatty, Lukas Engel and Leo Orgil) are Ruby teammates of the Featherhorn Flyers.
 Skip (voiced by Aris Athanasopoulos) is a ski-patroller and always helps anybody who is in danger of the slopes.
The Hoofington Hoofers are the arch rivals of the Featherhorn Flyers at Trotterball from Hoofing Hills.
Principal Golding (voiced by Jeffrey Knight) is the principal of Featherhorn Elementary.
Joey (voiced by Keegan Hedley) is a student at Featherhorn and best friend of Charlie.
Charlie (voiced by Benjamin Hum) is the newest student at Featherhorn.
Chris is a student at Featherhorn Elementary.
Hoofenstein (voiced by Ron Pardo)
Mr. Nickerson (voiced by Ron Pardo)
Orius (voiced by Adrian Truss) is an omniscient wizard who is Captain Thunderhoof's friend.
Megafrost (voiced by Brad Adamson)
Thundarians 
Scientist Judy
Grandmare (voiced by Julie Lemieux)
Pappy is also a student at Featherhorn Elementary, and also a minor character.

Production

Corn & Peg is produced by Nelvana in Canada. Storyboard services are provided by Oddbot Animation for season 1, and Pipeline Studios handled the animation for season 2. Development for the show began in spring of 2014. On April 5, 2019, it was announced that it was renewed for a second season.

Episodes

Series overview

Season 1 (2019–20)
The first season contained twenty 22-minute episodes.

Season 2 (2020)

Broadcast
Corn & Peg was first broadcast on Nickelodeon in the United States, as a sneak peek premiere of the second episode aired on February 22, 2019. The series premiered on March 4 on the main network, as the series simultaneously airs on its sister channel, Nick Jr. The series also broadcast on Treehouse TV in Canada on March 16. The series is also broadcast in UK and Australia.

Following the series' U.S. launch, it was broadcast internationally on other Nickelodeon channels in 2019 and 2020.

Awards and nominations 
In 2021, Treehouse TV and Nelvana received a Canadian Screen Award nomination for the show.

Merchandise
Random House published books based on the show. The first 2 books, Do-Gooders Unite and The Green Team were released on January 7, 2020. The next 3 books, a coloring book, a Golden Book entitled Time To Be Kind, and a picture book entitled Bubble Trouble, were released on July 7, 2020, and are published by Penguin Random House.

References

External links
 
 Production website
 

2010s Canadian animated television series
2020s Canadian animated television series
2019 Canadian television series debuts
2020 Canadian television series endings
Animated television series about horses
Fictional unicorns
Pegasus in popular culture
Canadian children's animated comedy television series
Canadian children's animated fantasy television series
Canadian children's animated musical television series
Canadian preschool education television series
Nick Jr. original programming
Treehouse TV original programming
Television series by Nelvana
Canadian animated comedy television series
English-language television shows